The Network of African National Human Rights Institutions (NANHRI) is one of four regional groupings within the global network, the Global Alliance for National Human Rights Institutions (GANHRI).  NANHRI promotes the establishment of national human rights institutions throughout Africa, and supports co-operation and training to strengthen and develop the monitoring, promotion, protection and advocacy work of African NHRIs.

Members

The following NANHRI members are (as of 30 May 2010) accredited with full "A status" by the ICC, hence deemed to be fully compliant with the Paris Principles:

Egypt
 National Council for Human Rights (Egypt)
Ghana
 Commission on Human Rights and Administrative Justice (CHRAJ)
Kenya
 Kenya National Commission on Human Rights (KNCHR)
Malawi
 Malawi Human Rights Commission
Mauritius
 National Human Rights Commission (Mauritius)
Morocco
 Human Rights Advisory Council (Morocco)
Namibia
 Office of the Ombudsman (Namibia)
Niger
 Nigerien National Commission on Human Rights and Fundamental Liberties
Rwanda
 National Commission for Human Rights (Rwanda)
Senegal
 Senegalese Committee for Human Rights
South Africa
 South African Human Rights Commission (SAHRC)
Tanzania
 Commission for Human Rights and Good Governance (Tanzania)
Togo
 National Human Rights Commission (Togo)
Uganda
 Uganda Human Rights Commission (UHRC)
Zambia
 Permanent Human Rights Commission (Zambia)

The following NANHRI members are (as of 30 May 2010) do not have full "A status":

Algeria
 National Human Rights Commission of Algeria
Angola
 Provedor de Justiça e de direitos (Angola)
Bénin
 Bénin Human Rights Commission
Burkina Faso
 National Human Rights Commission of Burkina Faso
Cameroon
 National Commission on Human Rights and Freedoms
Chad
 Chad National Human Rights Commission
Democratic Republic of the Congo
 National Human Rights Observatory (DR Congo)
Republic of the Congo
 National Human Rights Commission (Republic of the Congo)
Ethiopia
 Ethiopian Human Rights Commission
Gabon
 National Human Rights Commission (Gabon)
Madagascar
 National Human Rights Commission (Madagascar)
Mali
 Commission nationale consultative des droits de l’homme (Mali)
Mauritania
 Commissariat aux Droits de l’Homme, a la Lutte contre la Pauvreté et l’Insertion (Mauritania)
Nigeria
 National Human Rights Commission (Nigeria)
Sierra Leone
 Human Rights Commission of Sierra Leone
Sudan
 Southern Sudan Human Rights Commission
Tunisia
 Higher Committee on Human Rights and Fundamental Freedoms (Tunisia)

See also
 Human rights in Africa
 Asia Pacific Forum of National Human Rights Institutions (APF)
 European Group of National Human Rights Institutions
 Network of National Institutions in the Americas
 List of human rights articles by country
 Human Rights Commissions
 African Commission on Human and Peoples' Rights

External links
 NANHRI website
 

Human rights in Africa